Yohana Gómez Camino (born 20 January 1994) is a Spanish footballer who plays as a goalkeeper for Rayo Vallecano.

Club career
Gómez started her career at Guadamur.

References

External links
Profile at La Liga

1994 births
Living people
Women's association football goalkeepers
Spanish women's footballers
Sportspeople from Toledo, Spain
Footballers from Castilla–La Mancha
Real Madrid Femenino players
Rayo Vallecano Femenino players
Primera División (women) players
Deportivo de La Coruña (women) players
Primera Federación (women) players
21st-century Spanish women